Jose J. Solorio (born September 28, 1970) is an American politician from California. He was elected to the California State Assembly in 2006 as a Democrat. He represented the 69th Assembly District, which includes the city of Santa Ana and parts of Anaheim and Garden Grove. From 2016 to 2020, was the State Senate’s appointee to the California Student Aid Commission, which administers the Cal Grant and other state scholarship programs.

He was re-elected to the Santa Ana City Council in 2016.

Early civic career
Before being elected to the State Assembly, he was a Santa Ana City Council Member from 2000 until he became an assembly member in 2006.  He was appointed to the Orange County Water District Board of Directors and serves on the Board of Directors for the Boys and Girls Club of Santa Ana, and the Advisory Board for UC Irvine's Department of Planning, Policy, and Design.

Background and education
As the son of migrant farm workers, Solorio earned a Bachelor of Arts degree in social ecology at University of California, Irvine and a Master of Arts degree in public policy from Harvard University. He lives in Santa Ana, with his wife Linn, a Curriculum Specialist for Santa Ana Unified School District, and their two sons, Michael and Diego. Solorio is a vegetarian.

See also
List of University of California, Irvine people

References

External links
Campaign website
Join California Jose Solorio

1970 births
American politicians of Mexican descent
American public relations people
California city council members
Hispanic and Latino American state legislators in California
Living people
Democratic Party members of the California State Assembly
Harvard Kennedy School alumni
People from Santa Ana, California
University of California, Irvine alumni
21st-century American politicians